The ECHL presents numerous annual awards to recognize its teams, players, front office staff, and media contributors.  The first awards were given out in recognition of the achievements of the league's teams and players in the league's inaugural season of 1989 and included the Jack Riley Cup and Brabham Cup awarded to the league's teams and the Most Valuable Player, Playoffs Most Valuable Player, Rookie of the Year, Defenseman of the Year, Coach of the Year, and Leading Scorer awards to the league's players.  The league has added many other awards since the league's inception including, the Goaltender of the Year award in 1994, the Sportsmanship Award in 1997, separate titles for each of its conference playoff champions in 1998, and the Plus Performer Award in 2000.

Team trophies

Individual trophies and awards

Staff and miscellaneous awards

Gallery

References

See also 
 ECHL